Cyanothamnus bipinnatus, commonly known as rock boronia, is a plant in the citrus family, Rutaceae and is endemic to Queensland. It is an erect shrub with bipinnate or tripinnate leaves and white, four-petalled flowers. A more widespread species previously known as Boronia pinnata and also occurring in New South Wales is now considered to be B. occidentalis.

Description

Taxonomy and naming
This species was first formally described in 1848 by John Lindley and the description was published in Thomas Mitchell's Journal of an Expedition into the Interior of Tropical Australia. In a 2013 paper in the journal Taxon, Marco Duretto and others changed the name to Cyanothamnus bipinnatus on the basis of cladistic analysis. The specific epithet (bipinnatus) is derived from the Latin prefix bi- meaning "two" or "double" and pinnatus meaning "feathered", "plumed" or "winged".

Distribution and habitat
Rock boronia grows in woodland, sometimes on steep slopes and is found in the central highlands of Queensland with disjunct populations on the Blackdown Tableland and near St George.

References

bipinnatus
Flora of Queensland
Plants described in 1848
Taxa named by John Lindley